The North Jersey Soccer League is a defunct United States Adult Soccer Association-affiliated league that operated in Northern New Jersey.

Clubs 2013–14

World Division 
 United Serbs
 AC Milan
 Vlaznimi SC
 Lake Parisppany 
 New Jersey Lions FC
 10th & Willow Bar and Grill
 White Eagles SC
 GS Croatia FC
 Spring Street Strikers
 The Esteemed Colleagues 
 Parsippany Gators
 Kearny Scots

US Division 
 Lyndhurst FC
 Woodbridge Hungaria
 Oakland Strikers
 Sportfriends Soccer Club
 Vikings FC
 Startime
 NJ Gunners
 Falcons FC
 Parsippany Blues
 RD Benders
 SC Hokoah Bergen County

External links 
 North Jersey Soccer League

Soccer in New Jersey
United States Adult Soccer Association leagues
1990 establishments in New Jersey
Sports leagues established in 1990
Regional Soccer leagues in the United States